Grace Ladoja MBE is a British-Nigerian talent manager, music executive, director and entrepreneur. She is the co-founder of Metallic Inc. and the founder of Our Homecoming.

Early life 
Grace Ladoja was born in London, United Kingdom to Nigerian parents. She is the only child of the former Governor of Oyo State, Rashidi Ladoja.

Career 
Grace is well known for being the manager of the second grime rapper to win the mercury prize Skepta, and the manager of award-winning Nigerian record producer Sarz. She was the former manager of British model, Naomi Campbell. at aged 18, Ladoja directed an advert for American Multinational corporation Nike.

In 2017, Ladoja was named the Rising Star at the music week women in music by English trade publication Music Week.

In 2018, she was awarded an MBE (Member of the British Empire) by Queen Elizabeth II and was presented by the King of the United Kingdom and Commonwealth realms Charles III. Same year, she was listed as one of the 25 women shaping 2018 alongside Meghan, Duchess of Sussex, Ruth Davidson and Dua Lipa by British Vogue.

In 2020, she was profiled by the same magazine as a creative to add to your social feeds and one of the 20 stylish UK influencers by Evening Standard.

In March 2021, Grace was listed by Forbes as one of the 30 inspirational women. Same year, she was named the Entrepreneur of the Year at the Artist & Manager Awards.

Personal life 
Grace and Nigerian music star TeeZee are partners and they have a child together.

References 

Living people
Music industry executives
British people of Nigerian descent
Year of birth missing (living people)